The Journal of Early Modern Studies (JEMS) is a biannual double-blind peer-reviewed academic journal of intellectual history, specializing in  the   interactions between philosophy, science and religion in Early Modern Europe, published   by Zeta Books.

History 
The journal was established in 2012 by a group of Romanian scholars, at  the  Research Centre “Foundations of Modern Thought”  of the University of Bucharest. The journal appears twice a year, with occasional special issues.

Editors 

The editors-in-chief are Vlad Alexandrescu, and Dana Jalobeanu. The book review editor is Sorana Corneanu.

References

External links 

 Philosophy Documentation Center: e-hosting website

Multilingual journals
Publications established in 2012
Biannual journals
History of philosophy journals
European history journals
Philosophy Documentation Center academic journals